This is a list of the Maryland state historical markers in Saint Mary's County.

This is intended to be a complete list of the official state historical markers placed in Saint Mary's County, Maryland by the Maryland Historical Trust (MHT). The locations of the historical markers, as well as the latitude and longitude coordinates as provided by the MHT's database, are included below. There are currently 20 historical markers located in Saint Mary's County.

References 

Saint Mary's County